The Franklin-5 Representative District is a two-member state Representative district in the U.S. state of Vermont.  It is one of the 108 one or two member districts into which the state was divided by the redistricting and reapportionment plan developed by the Vermont General Assembly following the 2000 U.S. Census.  The plan applies to legislatures elected in 2002, 2004, 2006, 2008, and 2010.  A new plan will be developed in 2012 following the 2010 U.S. Census.

The Franklin-5 District includes all of the Franklin County towns of Sheldon and Swanton.

As of the 2000 census, the state, as a whole, had a population of 608,827. Being that there are a total of 150 representatives, there were also a total of 4,059 residents per representative (or 8,118 residents per two representatives). The two member Franklin-5 District had a population of 8,193, in that same census, which was 0.92% above the state average.

District Representatives
 Lisa Hango, Democratic
 Charen Fegard, Democratic

See also
Members of the Vermont House of Representatives, 2005-2006 session
Vermont Representative Districts, 2002-2012

External links
Vermont Statute defining legislative districts
 Vermont House districts -- Statistics

Vermont House of Representatives districts, 2002–2012
Sheldon, Vermont
Swanton, Vermont